Daniel Marois (born October 3, 1968) is a Canadian former professional ice hockey winger who played eight seasons in the National Hockey League from 1987–88 until 1995–96. He played in the NHL for the Toronto Maple Leafs, New York Islanders, Boston Bruins and Dallas Stars. He is the uncle of Winnipeg Jets player Mathieu Perreault.

Marois was drafted 28th overall in the 1987 NHL Entry Draft by the Maple Leafs. He played 350 career NHL games, scoring 117 goals and 93 assists for 210 points. In the 1989–90 NHL season, he set career highs with thirty-nine goals, thirty-seven assists and seventy six points in only sixty-eight games.. He is only the third player in modern Maple Leafs history (since 1943-44) to score multiple hat tricks in their first season with the club, following Wilf Paiement and later John Tavares, and is the only one to do so as a rookie.

As a youth, he played in the 1980 Quebec International Pee-Wee Hockey Tournament with a minor ice hockey team from Plessisville, Quebec.

Career statistics

Regular season and playoffs

International

References

External links

1968 births
Living people
Adler Mannheim players
Bolzano HC players
Boston Bruins players
Canadian expatriate ice hockey players in Italy
Canadian expatriate ice hockey players in Finland
Canadian expatriate ice hockey players in Germany
Canadian expatriate ice hockey players in Switzerland
Canadian ice hockey right wingers
Capital District Islanders players
Chicoutimi Saguenéens (QMJHL) players
HC Ambrì-Piotta players
Ice hockey people from Montreal
Ilves players
Kalamazoo Wings (1974–2000) players
Lausanne HC players
Minnesota Moose players
Newmarket Saints players
New York Islanders players
Providence Bruins players
Quebec Rafales players
Saint John Flames players
SC Bern players
SC Langenthal players
SC Rapperswil-Jona Lakers players
Toronto Maple Leafs draft picks
Toronto Maple Leafs players
Utah Grizzlies (IHL) players
Verdun Dragons players
Verdun Junior Canadiens players